Gram flour or besan is a pulse flour made from a variety of ground chickpea called Bengal gram or kaala chana. It is a staple ingredient in the cuisine of the Indian subcontinent, including in Indian, Bangladeshi, Burmese, Nepali, Pakistani, Sri Lankan and Caribbean cuisines.

Characteristics 
Gram flour contains a high proportion of carbohydrates, higher fiber relative to other flours, no gluten, and a higher proportion of protein than other flours.

Dishes

South Asia and the Caribbean
Gram flour is in popular use in the Indian subcontinent and the Caribbean, where it is used to make the following:

In Andhra Pradesh, it is used in a curry with gram flour cakes called Senaga Pindi Kura and is eaten with Chapati or Puri, mostly during winter for breakfast. Chila (or chilla), a pancake made with gram flour batter, is a popular street food in India.

Southeast and East Asia
Gram flour, which is called pe hmont (ပဲမှုန့်, lit. 'bean flour') in Burmese, is commonly used in Burmese cuisine. Roasted gram flour is commonly added to season Burmese salads, and is the principal ingredient of Burmese tofu. Roasted gram flour is also used to thicken several noodle soup dishes, including mohinga and ohn no khao swè.

Gram flour is also used to make jidou liangfen, a Yunnanese dish similar to Burmese tofu salad.

Southern Europe
Along the coast of the Ligurian Sea, flour made from garbanzo beans, which are a different variety of chickpea closely related to Bengal gram, is used to make a thin pancake that is baked in the oven. This popular street food is called farinata in Italian cuisine, fainâ in Genoa, and is known as socca or cade in French cuisine. It is used to make panelle, a fritter in Sicilian cuisine. In Spanish cuisine, gram flour is an ingredient for tortillitas de camarones.
Also in Cyprus and Greece, it is used as a garnishing ingredient for the funeral ritual food Koliva, blessed and eaten during Orthodox Memorial services. In the cuisine of Antakya in Turkey, it is used in the preparation of hummus.

North Africa
Popular in Algeria and East of Morocco , they make a dish called karan from gram flour and eggs, which is baked in the oven. A similar famous dish is prepared in Algeria called Garantita or Karantita (originated from the Spanish term Calentica, which means hot).

See also
List of chickpea dishes
Oralu kallu, a type of grinding machine using stone to produce flour in some parts of India
Kinako

Notes

Flour
Chickpea dishes